Katharo is a plateau on the Dikti mountain on the island of Crete, in the regional unit of Lassithi. Administratively it belongs to the municipality of Agios Nikolaos, (municipal division of Kritsa). On the West of the Katharo are the peaks of Spathi and Lazaros, and on the North East and East are the peaks of Tsivi and Platia Koryfi. The waters of the Plateau drain through the Havgas gorge into the much larger but lower Plateau of Lassithi, i.e. Katharo is part of river Aposelemis drainage area.

Due to its altitude the plateau is not inhabited in winter; in summer it has about 500 inhabitants, mainly shepherds and a few tavernas. Katharo has a special property status and is essentially community-owned. The fertile soil of the plateau is used for production of vegetables, potatoes and fruit (grapes, pears, apples).

External links

Landforms of Lasithi
Plateaus of Crete